Subject for a Short Story is a 1969 Soviet-French drama film directed by Sergei Yutkevich.

Plot 
The film tells about the life of Anton Pavlovich Chekhov, the process of creating the play "The Seagull", her production on the stage of the Alexandrinsky Theater and his relationship with Lika Mizinova.

Cast 
 Nikolai Grinko as Anton Pavlovich Chekhov
 Marina Vlady as Lika Mizinova
 Iya Savvina as Mariya Pavlovna Chekhova
 Rolan Bykov as Mikhail Pavlovich Chekhov
 Aleksandra Panova as Yevgeniya Yakovlevna Chekhova
 Yevgeny Lebedev
 Yury Yakovlev as Potapenko
 Leonid Gallis as Gilyarovskiy
 Vladimir Osenev as Kurbatov
 Yekaterina Vasilyeva as Ovchinnikova

References

External links 
 

1969 films
1960s Russian-language films
Soviet drama films
1969 drama films
French drama films
1960s French films